Michurin is a 1948 Soviet film directed by Oleksandr Dovzhenko about the life of Russian practitioner of selection Ivan Vladimirovich Michurin (1855–1935). The film is based on Dovzhenko's play Life in Bloom, which was also the title used for the film in its 1949 American release by Artkino Pictures

Synopsis

The film is set in the year 1912. Michurin declines the American's offer to work abroad and continues his studies in the Russian Empire, in spite of the fact that his ideas are not acknowledged by the tsarist government, the church and the idealistic science. Michurin receives support from outstanding scientists of the country, and continues to work untiringly. After the October Revolution, Michurin's small garden in the town of Kozlov (birthplace of the biologist) is transformed into a large state nursery.

Cast
 Grigori Belov as Ivan Michurin
 Fyodor Grigoryev as Kartashov
 Vladimir Isayevas Mayer
 Viktor Khokhryakov as Riabov
 Alla Larionova		
 Yuri Lyubimov as Translator
 Pavel Shamin as Terentiy
 Vladimir Solovyov as Mikhail Kalinin
 Sergei Tsenin as Byrd
 Aleksandra Vasilyeva as Michurin's wife
 Mikhail Zharov as Khrenov
 Alla Larionova (uncredited)
 Sergei Bondarchuk (IMDb entry lacking role name; not named in screen credits)

References

External links
 
 "Michurin": an interpretation

1948 films
1940s biographical drama films
Soviet biographical drama films
Russian biographical drama films
Soviet black-and-white films
Films directed by Alexander Dovzhenko
Mosfilm films
Films scored by Dmitri Shostakovich
Russian-language Ukrainian films
Russian black-and-white films

Films set in 1912